The People's Assembly (Parliament) of the Karachay-Cherkess Republic is the regional parliament of Karachay-Cherkessia, a federal subject of Russia. It consists of 50 deputies who are elected for five-year terms.

Overview
The deputies are elected on the basis of universal and direct suffrage by secret ballot.

The Chairman of the Government (prime minister) is appointed by the Head of Karachay-Cherkessia with the consent of the People's Assembly.

The presiding officer is the Chairman of the People's Assembly of Karachay–Cherkessia.

Elections

2019

See also
 List of Chairmen of the People's Assembly of Karachay-Cherkessia

References

Sources
 Kommersant - Russian Daily Online

Politics of Karachay-Cherkessia
Karachay-Cherkessia
Karachay-Cherkessia